Fernán José Faerrón Tristán (born 22 August 2000) is a Costa Rican footballer who plays as a centre-back.

Club career

Early years
Faerrón started playing football at the age of 11 in Cartago. He then played a year and a half at Deportivo Saprissa, before joining Fútbol Consultants Desamparados.

In 2017, 16-year old Faerrón joined Belén FC's professional team in the Liga FPD, where he was on the bench for seven games, however, without making his debut. He then returned to Fútbol Consultants Desamparados, this time as a first team player.

Professional career
Returning to Fútbol Consultants Desamparados - formerly known as FC Moravia - in the summer 2017, he made his first team debut for the club in the Costa Rican second division.

In May 2018, 17-year old Faerrón went on a trial at Norwegian club Vålerenga Fotball. However, he was never offered a contract. Shortly after returning, 18-year old Faerrón moved to Austrian club LASK, where he played for six months.

Faerrón returned to Costa Rica in 2019, signing on loan for Santos Guápiles. He scored in his debut for the club on 17 February 2019 against C.S. Cartaginés.

On 5 January 2020, Faerrón joined Alajuelense on loan. In February 2021, Faerrón signed a new contract with the club until June 2025. After the contract extension, rumors began to flourish that Faerrón had begun to become unpopular in the squad and that he had been in discussions with some of the players in the squad. As the situation didn't get better, in the summer of 2021, there was talk that Faerrón was on his way out of the club. After the criticism of him in the media, Faerrón went out on social media and stated that he didn't want to leave the club and that the rumors were untrue. He wrote, among other things, that he, like all people, had made mistakes, but also that he had a strong character, which did not always benefit him.

On 7 January 2022, Alajuelense's sporting director revealed, that Faerrón was offered to join the B-team of American club, Los Angeles Galaxy, in the summer 2021, but rejected, as he wanted to stay at Alajuelense. He also stated, that Faerrón now had asked to leave the club, as he wanted to go play abroad. Five days later, on 14 January, the club confirmed that Faerrón had left the club, without specifying further.

On 21 February 2022 it was confirmed, that Faerrón had joined Norwegian Eliteserien club HamKam, on a one-year loan from Desamparados.

References

External links
 

Living people
2000 births
Costa Rican footballers
Costa Rican expatriate footballers
Costa Rica youth international footballers
Association football defenders
Liga FPD players
Eliteserien players
Deportivo Saprissa players
Belén F.C. players
LASK players
Santos de Guápiles footballers
L.D. Alajuelense footballers
Hamarkameratene players
Costa Rican expatriate sportspeople in Austria
Costa Rican expatriate sportspeople in Norway
Expatriate footballers in Austria
Expatriate footballers in Norway